The Trans-Arunachal Highway (TAH), which includes an existing  route comprising NH-13 and parts of NH-15, NH-215 and SH-25, is an under-construction 2-lane more than  long highway passing through 16 districts in Arunachal Pradesh state in India. It runs from LAC in Tawang in northwest to Kanubari in southeast at tri-junction of Assam-Nagaland-Arunachal Pradesh. It connects at least 16 districts of Arunachal Pradesh. 

The Trans-Arunachal Highway, passing through the entire length of the state, roughly divides Arunachal Pradesh state in two parts - the upper two-third in north and east and lower one-third.  At least 1811 km route already exists as national highway, and remaining are either greenfield or an upgrade of existing routes to national highway standard. It starts from India's north most military post (north of Hathung La Ridge) in Tawang district, goes via Zemithang, Tawang, Bomdila, Nechipu, Seppa, Sagalee, Yupia, Yazali, Ziro, Daporijo, Aalo, Pasighat, southern part of Dibang Valley district, Lohit, Roing, Tezu, Mahadevpur, Bordumsa, Namchik, Changlang, Khonsa, Longding, and ends at Kanubari.  

The Trans-Arunachal Highway greatly helps in reducing isolation of the people by connecting the district headquarters, major hydro electric power projects and other important places. Trans-Arunachal Highway, along with the under-construction Arunachal East-West Corridor across the lower foothills inside Arunachal Pradesh along the Assam border and the proposed Arunachal Frontier Highway along the China border, are important enablers of Northeast development and India's Look East connectivity strategy. This strategically important highway network enhances Indian military's capabilities in combating the threat of China's Western Theater Command opposite India's eastern sector of Line of Actual Control.

In October 2022, 1,458 km long route was complete and already operational. TAH, from Tawang to Kanubari in Longding district has a target completion date of March 2024.

History 

In January 2008, the project was announced by then Prime Minister of India, Manmohan Singh.

Construction agencies 

Following follow agencies are responsible for the construction of TAH in several packages.

 Arunachal Pradesh state Public Works Department (APPWD): responsible for the 978 km, of which 394.59 km is already complete by Aug 2021, and remaining 583.41 km is under construction in several packages with target completion date of March 2024.
 Border Roads Organisation (BRO)
 Ministry of Road Transport and Highways (MoRTH)
 National Highways and Infrastructure Development Corporation Limited (NHIDCL)

Project details

Route: existing 

 Tawang-Seppa: Existing NH-13. Sela Tunnel, with target completion by Jan/Feb 2022, will provide shorter all-weather alternative connectivity. 

 Nag Mandir - Gohenthan: Missing direct connectivity. There is no direct route, the present alternate connectivity is via a semi-circular NH-13 loop through Doimukh 

 Gohenthan-Seppa: Existing NH-13.
 
 Seppa-Yachuli: Missing direct connectivity. There is no direct route, the present alternate connectivity is via a semi-circular NH-13 loop through Doimukh.

 Yachuli-Pasighat-Wakro: Existing NH-13.

 Wakro-Namsai: Existing NH-15.

 Namsai-Jairampur: Missing direct connectivity. Existing longer alternate route is outside Arunachal Pradesh and it runs through Assam as NH-215 and NH-315. 

 Jairampur-Longvi-Changlang-Longding-Kanubari-NH-702: upgrade of existing, present status is unknown.

 Bordumsa-Vijoynagar: Missing upgrade. Rough connectivity exists, upgrade of existing routes to NH standard and construction of Piyong-Goju bridge on Noadhing River as well as environmental approval for road through Namdapha National Park are needed.

Route: yet to be constructed/upgraded 

Following are either greenfield connectivity or upgrade of existing roads to national highway standard,

 West
 Rupa-Bhutan border: upgrade of existing from NH-13 - Sheggaon - Ching - Sumdrung, then greenfield to Bhutan border. 
 Rahung-Sube (Dizanggania) direct route: to construct the missing direct connectivity along Kameng River via BICHOM dam.
 Nag Mandir - Gohenthan direct route: Construct greenfield. 
 Seppa-Yachuli direct route: to construct the missing direct connectivity via Mengio HQ and Meomey Sullong

 East
 Namsai-Jairampur spur: Upgrade of existing connectivity from Namsai on NH-15, via Piyong - greenfield bridge over Noadhing River - Goju - Namchick Check Post, to Jairampur.
 Bordumsa-Vijoynagar spur: Upgrade of existing connectivity from Bordumsa on NH-215, via Goju  - greenfield bridge over Noadhing River (same bridge as mentioned in Namsai-Jairampur spur) - Piyong - Namdapha National Park - Vijoynagar - Myanmar border.

Future extensions 

Following extensions are needed to optimise the connectivity with the neighboring states and beyond, as these extensions will enable the larger national strategic objectives including eliminating the vulnerability of Siliguri Corridor.
 
 Changlang-Bogibeel Bridge spur: Greenfield Changlang-Soha Camp-Deomali-Namrup, upgrade of existing Namrup - Digahlia No 2 - 1 No Lengeri Gaon - Geori Gaon, then continue on existing NH-2-Lepet Kata, from Lepetkata on NH-2 to Bogibeel Bridge.
 Bogibeel Bridge to Tuli extension of above: via Lezai Miri Pathergam, Naharani on NH-2, Hati Barua and Charimuthia Gaon to Changdhore, greenfield from Changdhore and Lahon to Yaongyimsen Comp. Ladaihgarh to Tuli spur.

 Sumdrung in Arunachal - Kangpar-Pasapu-Narpu in Bhutan
 Arunachal-Sikkim via Bhutan: Narpu-Galechugaon-Darphu-Chukka-Dengna-Dorokha - Rango Forest on India-Bhutan border, to NH-717A at beginning of SH-12
 SH-12: Upgrade from Bhutan border to Nepal border at Mana Bhanjang.
 Nepal-India connectivity: Mana Bhanjang on Nepal-West Bengal border to Gooduk (upgrade existing), Damak (greenfield), to Chichhora (upgrade existing F02) on Nepal-Bihar border.
 Bihar connectivity: upgrade existing SH-99 Chichhora-Jogihat-Baisi to NH-29.

Six Inter-corridor highways

To providing missing interconnectivity between three horizontal national highways across Arunachal Pradesh - Frontier Highway, Trans-Arunachal Highway and East-West Industrial Corridor Highway - following six vertical and diagonal national highway corridors of total 2178 km length will be built, which will also provide faster access to geostrategically important areas on India-China LAC.

Listed west to east.

 Thelamara-Tawang-Nelia Highway: 402 km long highway connecting Thelamara in Assam to Kamengbari-Doimara, Shergaon, new greenfield highway along Bhutan-Arunachal border, Grelleng, Tawang, and Nelia on LAC border.

 Itakhola-Pakke-Kessang-Seppa-Parsi Parlo Highway: 391 km long highway will connect Itakhola in Assam, Seijosa southeast corner of Pakke Tiger Reserve in Arunachal, Pakke Kessang circle HQ, Seppa HQ of East Kameng district, Chayangtajo circle HQ in East Kameng district, Sangram circle HQ on Koloriang-Ziro highway in Kurung Kumey district, Parsi Parlo circle HQ east of Koloriang district HQ of Kurung Kamey district.

 Gogamukh-Taliha-Tato Highway: 285 km long highway from Gogamukh in Assam to Taliha (north of Daporijo HQ of Upper Subansiri district) and Tato (northeast of Taliha).

 Akajan-Jorging-Pango Highway: 398 km long highway from Akajan near Silapathar in Assam to Aalo, Jorging (Jorsing), Pango (in Migging circle) south to Tuting in LAC).
 
 Pasighat-Bishing Highway: 298 km long highway to connect Pasighat to Bishing on LAC border with a straight alignment.

 Kanubari-Longding Highway: 404 km long highway.

Current status 

 Feb 2018:  Tawang to Wakro NH-13 became operational in 2018 when 6.2 km long Dibang River Bridge was completed across Dibang River. This completion of entire NH-13, partially completes the route for Trans-Arunachal Highway.

 Aug 2021: TAH, from Tawang to Kanubari, is being constructed by 4 entities: Arunachal Pradesh state PWD (APPWD), BRO, MoRTH, and NHIDCL. Of the 978 km allocated to APPWD, 394.59 km is already complete and remaining 583.41 km is under construction in several packages with target completion date of March 2024.

 October 2022: 1,458 km long route, out of 1,540 km long approved DPR, is complete and operational. Remaining 82 km is under construction. Another nearly 300 km long roure is either being completed under other projects or the DPRs are in various stages of preparation and approval.

Related connectivity 

 Arunachal Pradesh connectivity projects
 Bhalukpong-Tawang railway, under-construction 
 Arunachal Frontier Highway, proposed along Indo-China border across upper Arunachal Pradesh
 Arunachal East-West Corridor, proposed across foothills of lower upper Arunachal Pradesh

 Northeast connectivity projects
 Northeast Connectivity projects
 Look-East Connectivity projects
 North-South and East-West Corridor
 India-Myanmar-Thailand Friendship Highway
 BCIM Economic Corridor
 Asian Highway Network
 List of bridges on Brahmaputra River

See also 
 List of National Highways in India (by Highway Number)
 List of National Highways in India
 National Highways Development Project
 Expressways of India
 Golden Quadrilateral (GQ)

References 

Proposed roads in India
Proposed infrastructure in Arunachal Pradesh
Roads in Arunachal Pradesh